Blanche Grambs (1916–2010) was an American artist who is known for her prints depicting the Great Depression, coal miners, the poor, and the unemployed.

Life
She was born in Beijing, China. She trained at the Art Students League in New York under Harry Sternberg. She worked in the Works Progress Administration's Federal Art Project during the New Deal, beginning in 1936 and producing over 30 prints for the WPA. She created lithographs and intaglio prints.

Grambs was actively political, attending classes in Marxist theory at the New York Workers School and participating in communist rallies. She was arrested in 1936 at an organized sit-in, protesting cuts to the WPA FAP budget. For her art, she traveled to Lanceford, Pennsylvania to create prints and etchings of the coal miners. Grambs' work reflected her political leanings and commitment to social reform.

She married Hugh "Lefty" Miller, and they moved to Paris together. Shortly after their arrival, war broke out, and they moved back to New York, where she continued to work as an artist. Her later work included contributing illustrations to over 30 children's books. 

Grambs' work is held in the Metropolitan Museum of Art, the Philadelphia Museum of Art, the Detroit Institute of Art, the Crystal Bridges Museum of American Art, the Art Institute of Chicago, the Baltimore Museum of Art, the British Museum, the Smithsonian American Art Museum, and the University of Michigan Museum of Art.

Gallery

References

External links

1916 births
2010 deaths
Art Students League of New York alumni
Painters from Beijing
20th-century American painters
American women printmakers
American women painters
20th-century American women artists
Federal Art Project artists
20th-century American printmakers
American women illustrators
American expatriates in China
21st-century American women